Today and Tomorrow can refer to:

Film and television
 Today and Tomorrow (1912 film), by Michael Curtiz
 Today and Tomorrow (2003 film), by Alejandro Chomski
 "Today and Tomorrow" (Fear the Walking Dead), an episode of American TV series Fear the Walking Dead

Music
 Today and Tomorrow (McCoy Tyner album), 1964
 Today & Tomorrow  (Sault album) album by Sault, 2022
 Today & Tomorrow, a 2005 EP by Matt Wertz

Other uses
 To-day and To-morrow, a series of speculative essays published by Kegan Paul in the 1920s